Elachista filicornella is a moth of the family Elachistidae. It is found in southern Kazakhstan.

References

filicornella
Moths described in 1992
Moths of Asia